The montane bamboo rat or Peruvian bamboo rat (Dactylomys peruanus), is a species of rodent in the family Echimyidae. It is found in Bolivia and Peru. Its natural habitat is subtropical or tropical moist lowland forests.

References

Dactylomys
Mammals described in 1900
Taxonomy articles created by Polbot